Khentei may refer to:
Khentii Mountains
Khentei Range
Khentei-Daur Highlands